Rita Ann Johnson (August 13, 1913 – October 31, 1965) was an American actress.

Early years
Johnson was born in Worcester, Massachusetts, the daughter of a single mother, Lillian Johnson.

She worked as a waitress in her mother's lunchroom and sold hot dogs on the Boston-Worcester turnpike. She later attended the New England Conservatory of Music.

Career
Early in her career, Johnson was busy in radio. "By 1936 she... was appearing in ten radio shows a week." She played the leading role in Joyce Jordan, M.D..

Johnson began acting on Broadway in 1935 and started her film career two years later. She played a murderer in Here Comes Mr. Jordan (1941) and a doomed wife in the RKO film noir They Won't Believe Me (1947).

In an incident that was never fully explained, Johnson suffered a head trauma on September 6, 1948 that required brain surgery. Unsubstantiated rumors promulgated by gossip columnists such as Walter Winchell suggested she might have been abused by a boyfriend, but the only explanation she offered was that a large, industrial-grade hair dryer at her apartment had fallen on her. She was in a coma for two weeks and it was reported, "It took her a year to recover. Her left side was paralyzed temporarily, and for a while she couldn't walk." It put a virtual halt to her film career. Her screen time in movies after that was limited due to her reduced mobility and powers of concentration.

Personal life
Johnson was married to businessman L. Stanley Kahn. They were granted a divorce on June 29, 1943. She was married to Edwin Hutzler from 1943 to 1946, when they were divorced. A Democrat, she supported Adlai Stevenson during the 1952 presidential election. She was a practicing Roman Catholic. 

Johnson suffered from alcoholism from the time of her injuries until her death of a brain hemorrhage on October 31, 1965, at age 52.

Partial filmography

London by Night (1937) – Patricia Herrick
My Dear Miss Aldrich (1937) – Ellen Warfield
Man-Proof (1938) – Florence
Letter of Introduction (1938) – Honey
Smashing the Rackets (1938) – Letty Lane
Rich Man, Poor Girl (1938) – Sally Harrison
The Girl Downstairs (1938) – Rosalind Brown
Honolulu (1939) – Cecelia Grayson
Within the Law (1939) – Agnes
Broadway Serenade (1939) – Judith Tyrrell
6,000 Enemies (1939) – Anne Barry
Stronger Than Desire (1939) – Barbara Winter
They All Come Out (1939) – Kitty Carson
Nick Carter, Master Detective (1939) – Lou Farnsby
Congo Maisie (1940) – Kay McWade
The Golden Fleecing (1940) – Marian Edwards
Edison, the Man (1940) – Mary Stilwell
Forty Little Mothers (1940) – Mary Blake
Maisie Was a Lady (1941) – Minor Role (scenes deleted)
Here Comes Mr. Jordan (1941) – Julia Farnsworth
Appointment for Love (1941) – Nancy Benson
The Major and the Minor (1942) – Pamela Hill
My Friend Flicka (1943) – Nell McLaughlin
The Affairs of Susan (1945) – Mona Kent
Thunderhead, Son of Flicka (1945) – Nelle McLaughlin
The Naughty Nineties (1945) – Bonita Farrow
Pardon My Past (1945) – Mary Pemberton
The Perfect Marriage (1947) – Mabel Manning
The Michigan Kid (1947) – Sue Dawson
They Won't Believe Me (1947) – Greta Ballentine
Sleep, My Love (1948) – Barby
The Big Clock (1948) – Pauline York
An Innocent Affair (1948) – Eve Lawrence
Family Honeymoon (1948) – Minna Fenster
The Second Face (1950) – Claire Elwood
Susan Slept Here (1954) – Dr. Rawley, Harvey's Shrink
Emergency Hospital (1956) – Head Nurse Norma Mullin
All Mine to Give (1957) – Katie Tyler (final film role)

Radio appearances

References

External links

 
 
 
 

1913 births
1965 deaths
20th-century American actresses
Actresses from Worcester, Massachusetts
American film actresses
American stage actresses
American radio actresses
Burials at Holy Cross Cemetery, Culver City
New England Conservatory alumni
California Democrats
Massachusetts Democrats
American Roman Catholics